is a former Japanese football player. He played for Japan national team.

Club career
Tanaka was born in Shizuoka on August 8, 1975. After graduating from Shimizu Commercial High School, he joined Júbilo Iwata in 1994. From 1997, he became a regular player as center back and central player in golden era in club history. The club won many title 1997, 1999, 2002 J1 League, 1998 J.League Cup and 2003 Emperor's Cup. In Asia, the club won the champions 1998–99 Asian Club Championship and the 2nd place 1999–00 and 2000–01 Asian Club Championship. He left the club end of 2008 season for generational change. He moved to J2 League club Avispa Fukuoka in 2009. The club won the 3rd place in 2010 and was promoted to J1 League. He announced his retirement at the end of the 2011 season having played over 500 in his career.

National team career
In July 1996, Tanaka was selected for the Japanese U-23 team for the 1996 Summer Olympics. He played in all 3 of Japan's matches as they were eliminated in the group stage, despite two wins, including one against Brazil. It was known as the "Miracle of Miami" (マイアミの奇跡) in Japan.

On April 25, 2004, Tanaka debuted for the Japanese national team against Hungary. At the 2004 AFC Asian Cup in China, he played all 6 matches as Japan won the title. He also represented Japan at the 2005 FIFA Confederations Cup. In 2006, he was called up for Japan's 2006 FIFA World Cup squad, but had to withdraw after sustaining a thigh injury prior to the tournament. In total, he played 32 matches for the national team.

Club statistics

National team statistics

National team
 2004 Asian Cup (Champions)
 2005 Confederations Cup

Honors and awards

Individual
 J1 League Best Eleven: 1998, 2002

Club
Júbilo Iwata
 AFC Champions League: 1998–99
 Asian Super Cup: 1999
 J1 League: 1997, 1999, 2002
 Emperor's Cup: 2003
 J.League Cup: 1998
 Japanese Super Cup: 2000, 2003, 2004

International
Japan
 AFC Asian Cups: 2004

References

External links

 
Japan National Football Team Database

1975 births
Living people
Association football people from Shizuoka Prefecture
Japanese footballers
Japan international footballers
J1 League players
J2 League players
Júbilo Iwata players
Avispa Fukuoka players
Footballers at the 1996 Summer Olympics
2004 AFC Asian Cup players
2005 FIFA Confederations Cup players
AFC Asian Cup-winning players
Olympic footballers of Japan
Association football defenders